Himaja Mallireddy (born 2 November 1990) is an Indian model and actress who works primarily in Telugu cinema. She is popularly known for her debut serial Konchem Istam Konchem Kastam and primarily known for her roles in movies Sathamanam Bhavati, Vunnadhi Okate Zindagi and Chitralahari. She participated as a contestant in Season 3 of Bigg Boss and evicted on day 63.

Early life and career 
Himaja hails from Veerlapalem in Guntur district, Andhra Pradesh. She first acted in a tele-film "Sarvaantaryaami" which is about Sai Baba which was produced by her father Mallireddy Chandrasekhar Reddy and telecasted on MAA TV on the occasion of Guru Pournami. She worked as a model and TV host before she pursued a career in films. She worked as a TV host at Tollywood TV.

Filmography

Television

References

Living people
1990 births
21st-century Indian actresses
Actresses in Telugu cinema
Actresses in Tamil cinema
Bigg Boss (Telugu TV series) contestants
Telugu actresses
People from Guntur district
Actresses from Andhra Pradesh
Actresses in Telugu television
Indian television actresses
Indian film actresses